Two Different Worlds may refer to:
"Two Different Worlds" (1956 song), a song co-written in 1956 by Sid Wayne and Al Frisch
"Two Different Worlds", a song by LL Cool J from his 1989 album Walking with a Panther